Michael Nozik is an American film producer. He won a BAFTA award for The Motorcycle Diaries in the category of 'Best Film Not in the English Language' in 2004. His credits also include Love in the Time of Cholera, Syriana, Quiz Show, and The Legend of Bagger Vance.

Filmography 
He was a producer in all films unless otherwise noted.

Film

Production manager

Location management

Second unit director or assistant director

Thanks

Television

Production manager

References

External links 

Year of birth missing (living people)
Film producers from Massachusetts
Filmmakers who won the Best Foreign Language Film BAFTA Award
People from Holyoke, Massachusetts
Living people